Miss Slovakia is a national beauty pageant in Slovakia.

History
Miss Slovensko was formed in 1993 after the dissolution of Czechoslovakia. From 1993 to 1995, they selected the winner to Miss Universe and the runner-ups to Miss World and Miss International. However, in 1996, when OKLAMČÁK PRODUCTION took over the Miss Slovensko franchise, it temporarily lost the Miss World franchise to another organization before getting it back in 1998. Since then, in cooperation with the OKLAMČÁK Production agency and TV JOJ, the FORZA PRODUCTION HOUSE has been organizing the most prestigious female beauty pageant in the country, Miss Slovensko. OKLAMČÁK PRODUCTION agency established in 1995 to seek the admiration of beauty. Its founder Jozef Oklamčák is known as a manager beauty contests and events. Slovakia and the world is his name professionally mainly associated with female beauty. He is the founder beauty pageants MISS Slovakia and founder of the pop music music poll of the most popular Slovak singer, singer, and-SLOVAK donuts. FORZA, since its inception in 1994, is ranked among the biggest and most prestigious production company in Slovakia. Involved in a wide range of multimedia, audiovisual, film and television projects in Slovakia and abroad, such as Miss Slovakia, Nightingale, music festival Fest Europe 2 salon and fashion shows Lydia Eckhardt.

Pageant
The Miss Slovensko beauty pageant begins with a media campaign to announce the annual contest process.  The application forms are published in selected print media for several weeks running and must be submitted by applicants with a photo showing both face and body to the FORZA Production House.  Potential contestants must: be single, have no children, be a citizen of the Slovak Republic, be over 170 cm tall and on the day of the contest finale, they must be between the ages of 18 and 24.  On the basis of these criteria, the girls are divided into regional casting sections. Each year, finalists go through a complex preparation process for the beauty contest.  In addition to individual work, preparation includes two, week-long training sessions.  These two sessions are devoted primarily to choreography and voice training for the girls.  For these girls who are competing to be the most beautiful Slovak woman, the most interesting part is working with renowned experts in cosmetics, make-up, and hair styling.  In the end, every detail can play a role in the beauty pageant itself.  During this preparatory period, contestants go through their first costume and accessory fittings, rehearsals of choreography for the final evening and work with a speech and diction coach. The climax of the annual MISS Slovakia contest is the grand finale shown live on TV JOJ. Each year, finalists’ rewards include contracts with an agency, automobiles, exotic vacations and eventual nomination to prestigious international beauty contests, such as Miss World, Miss International, Miss Supranational and Miss Europe.

Titleholders

OKLAMČÁK PRODUCTION agency

Big Four pageants

Miss World Slovakia
Color key

Miss Slovensko Organization has become the national franchise holder for two of the Big Four international beauty pageants namely: Miss World, Miss International contests. The winner goes to Miss World while 1st runner up is selected for Miss International.

Miss International Slovakia
Color key

Minor pageants

Miss Supranational Slovakia
Color key

The 2nd runner up is selected for Miss Supranational.

References

External links
 Official Miss Slovensko website
 Official partner Miss Slovensko 2016 @Eva.cas

Slovakia
Slovakia
Beauty pageants in Slovakia
Recurring events established in 1993
1993 establishments in Slovakia
Slovak awards